Nay San Lwin (born 1978) is a prominent Rohingya political activist and blogger from Myanmar. He is a prolific commentator on Rohingya issues on radio, television channels and other mainstream media outlets. He was publicly attacked by the Myanmar presidential office and state counsellor's office for his role in getting out news about military atrocities in Northern Rakhine State.

Nay San Lwin was born in Buthidaung, and raised in Rangoon. His parents were civil servants in Myanmar. His grandfathers were high-ranking officers in Buthidaung Township, Arakan State. His great-grandfather Mr. Abdul Zolil was officially recognized as an indigenous person in Burma (Myanmar).

He co-founded the Free Rohingya Coalition with Maung Zarni.

References

Living people
Burmese activists
1978 births